Sierra Burgess Is a Loser is an American teen comedy-drama film directed by Ian Samuels from a screenplay by Lindsey Beer. The film is a modern retelling of the 1897 play Cyrano de Bergerac by Edmond Rostand, and stars Shannon Purser, Kristine Froseth, RJ Cyler, and Noah Centineo. The film was released on September 7, 2018, by Netflix.

Plot
Sierra is smart and aspirational, striving to get admitted into Stanford University. She isn't popular, and not considered attractive. Popular classmate Veronica both criticizes and insults her, which she answers with wit and sidesteps with charm.

Jamey is a handsome football player from another high school; he doesn't know that Veronica has a "boyfriend" attending college, and so he asks for her phone number. Wanting to dodge Jamey's attention, she gives him Sierra's phone number as if it were her own.

Jamey and Sierra begin texting, where they exchange messages and flirt. Although she realizes he believes he's communicating with someone else, she develops a crush on him. In band class, Sierra tells her best friend Dan that she has met someone,  explaining how it happened. He disapproves of Sierra‘s actions, but she defends herself by saying that Jamey's decisions to engage with her have only been based on his interactions with her.

Sierra approaches Veronica, upset after being dumped by her college boyfriend, Spence, because he considers her dumb. She offers to tutor Veronica, in exchange for help in continuing to talk to Jamey. Veronica agrees, and they begin tutoring. As they continue helping each other, Sierra learns more about Veronica's frustrating family life, and Veronica develops appreciation for Sierra.

Veronica reveals how her father abandoned her mother for a 22-year-old and how it has affected them. Her overbearing mother pushes her into cheerleading and popularity. One night, Jamey video calls Veronica, who appears on the camera screen while Sierra talks behind it. The video call soon ends when Jamey tells her there is lag, and as soon as they hang up, the girls gleefully laugh together as it worked. Although initially cold to each other, Veronica and Sierra end up becoming friends.

When Jamey asks Sierra (who he thinks is Veronica) out on a date, Veronica goes with him as a favor to Sierra. However, when he tries to kiss her, she tells him to close his eyes and Sierra kisses him instead.

Before a football game, Jamey kisses Veronica. She gets angry at him for it, because she feels like she is betraying Sierra. Jamey does not understand why she is angry, Sierra witnesses the kiss and gets upset. As revenge, she broadcasts to everyone that Veronica was dumped by her ex-boyfriend. During the football game, Veronica angrily tells Jamey the truth, and when a panicked Sierra attempts to defend herself and explain, he recognizes her voice. Shocked, he tells both Sierra and Veronica to stay away from him and he leaves.

Sierra writes a song called "Sunflower" and sends it to Veronica as an apology. Veronica confronts her mother, telling her she needs to be her own person. Then she shows up at Jamey's to make him listen to the song and tell him that Sierra is a great girl. He decides to forgive Sierra and take her to homecoming, bringing her a sunflower. Expressing his feelings, he says she is exactly his type. They kiss again and go to homecoming together. At the dance when Veronica and Sierra see each other, without a word, they reconcile by sharing a hug, joined by Dan.

Cast

 Shannon Purser as Sierra Burgess, a bright but unpopular teenager 
 Kristine Froseth as Veronica, a popular cheerleader and, eventually, reformed mean girl
 RJ Cyler as Dan, Sierra's best friend
 Noah Centineo as Jamey, a high school quarterback and Sierra's accidental love interest 
 Loretta Devine as Mrs. Thomson, Sierra's English teacher
 Giorgia Whigham as Chrissy, Veronica's friend and fellow cheerleader
 Alice Lee as Mackenzie, Veronica's friend and fellow cheerleader
 Lea Thompson as Jules Osborn-Burgess, Sierra's mother
 Alan Ruck as Stephen Burgess, Sierra's father
 Mary Pat Gleason as Counselor Stevens, Sierra's high school guidance counselor
 Chrissy Metz as Trish, Veronica's overbearing and estranged mother
 Elizabeth Tovey as Brody, Veronica's little twin sister
 Mariam Tovey as Scooter, Veronica's little twin sister
 Matt Malloy as Biology Teacher
 Will Peltz as Spence
 Geoff Stults as Coach Johnson
 Wolfgang Novogratz as Drew

Production

The film was first announced in September 2016 as a modern retelling of Cyrano de Bergerac, to be directed by Ian Samuels from a screenplay by Lindsey Beer (Chaos Walking). Ben Hardy had been set to play the male lead role. In the same announcement, it was revealed Molly Smith and Thad Luckinbill's Black Label Media (Sicario, La La Land) would produce the film, with Beer executive producing. On January 18, 2018, it was announced that Netflix had acquired the rights to the film.

In December 2016, RJ Cyler was cast as the title character's best friend. On January 5, 2017, Shannon Purser was set to star as Sierra Burgess, and the following day, Kristine Froseth was cast in a supporting role. Later that same month, Will Peltz was also added. On February 1, 2017, Noah Centineo was set for the male lead, taking over from Ben Hardy. Also in February 2017, Lea Thompson and Alan Ruck were cast as the title character's parents.

In July 2017, songwriter and musician Leland announced that he had completed scoring the film, with Bram Inscore. In addition, he stated that the pair had also co-written a song with Troye Sivan and Allie X that would be featured in the film. The group co-wrote a song with the film's screenwriter, Lindsey Beer, entitled "Sunflower", an original song written in the script and performed by Shannon Purser.

Release
The film was released on September 7, 2018, on Netflix.

Reception
The website's critical consensus reads, "Sierra Burgess Is a Loser, but her movie's okay - largely thanks to Shannon Purser's work in the title role, which is strong enough to counter an uneven narrative." On Metacritic, the film has a weighted average score of 60 out of 100, based on 14 critics, indicating "mixed or average reviews".

Proma Khosla from Mashable criticized the movie for romanticizing certain character choices by the female protagonist, Sierra Burgess, specifically her catfishing and sharing a non-consensual kiss with her love interest, hacking, cyber bullying and mistreating her friend, and pretending to be deaf with support from one of her friends. Hannah Giorgis from The Atlantic similarly criticized the movie, stating it "disappointingly fails to indict the protagonist’s deceptive behavior".

See also
 List of films featuring the deaf and hard of hearing

References

External links
 

2010s teen comedy-drama films
2010s high school films
American films based on plays
American high school films
American teen comedy-drama films
Black Label Media films
English-language Netflix original films
Films based on Cyrano de Bergerac (play)
2018 directorial debut films
2010s English-language films
2010s American films